PowerDEVS [BK011] is a general purpose software tool for DEVS  modeling and simulation oriented to the simulation of hybrid systems.  The environment allows   defining atomic DEVS models in C++ language that can be then graphically coupled in hierarchical block diagrams to create more complex systems.

It is developed at Universidad Nacional de Rosario (Argentina) by Ernesto Kofman, Federico Bergero, Gustavo Migoni, Enrique Hansen, Joaquín Fernandez,  Marcelo Lapadula and Esteban Pagliero.

The distribution is totally free.

References 
 [CK06] 
 [Zeigler76] 
 [BK11]

External links 
 PowerDEVS project at SourceForge
 Dr. Kofman's Laboratory for System Dynamics and Signal Processing at Universidad Nacional de Rosario: http://www.fceia.unr.edu.ar/lsd/

Automata (computation)
Formal specification languages
Simulation software